The Tenang railway station was a Malaysian railway halt located at and named after the town of Tenang, Segamat District, Johor. This halt did not provide KTM Intercity train services.

Closure
Tenang station closed when the station was not selected for rebuilding as part of the Gemas-Johor Bahru double-tracking and electrification project.

See also
 Rail transport in Malaysia

Defunct railway stations in Malaysia
Segamat District
Railway stations in Johor